FIVB Volleyball Challenger Cup may refer to
 FIVB Volleyball Men's Challenger Cup
 FIVB Volleyball Women's Challenger Cup